Imogen, or Imogene, is a female given name of uncertain etymology.

Origin
It is possible that the name Imogen may have originated as an accidental or deliberate misspelling of the name Innogen, itself a possibly common Irish Gaelic name in the past, from the word 'inghean' meaning "maiden" or "girl", or a British Celtic name derived from the Latin . Innogen is known as the name of a legendary British queen and was supposedly wife to King Brutus and mother of Locrinus, Albanactus and Camber. The form Innogen is rare. Another theory is that it is derived from the Greek, meaning "beloved child".

Imogen was the name of a politically influential sister of Rivallon I of Dol, a contemporary and ally of William the Conqueror during the Breton-Norman War.

Popularity
In Australia, Imogen was the 35th most popular girls name from 2011 to 2013, while in England and Wales it was the 34th most popular baby girl name in 2014. As of July 2014, Imogen had never been in the top 1000 most popular baby names in the United States, with only 131 baby girls named Imogen in the US in 2013. It was ranked 86th in popularity for baby girls in Scotland in 2007.

People
 Imogen Annesley (born 1970), Australian actress
 Imogen Bailey (born 1977), Australian model, actress and singer
 Imogen Bankier (born 1987), Scottish badminton player
 Imogen Boorman (born 1971), British actress from Hellbound: Hellraiser II
 Imogen Cairns (born 1989), British gymnast
 Imogene Coca (born 1908), American comic actress
 Imogen Cooper (born 1949), English pianist
 Imogen Cunningham (born 1883), American photographer
 Imogen Edwards-Jones (born 1968), British author
 Imogen Hassall (born 1942), British actress
 Imogen Heap (born 1977), English singer-songwriter
 Imogen Holst (born 1907), British composer and conductor
 Imogen Kogge (born 1957), German actress
 Imogen LaChance (1853–1838), American social reformer
 Imogen Lloyd Webber (born 1977), British writer and theatre manager
 Imogen Murphy, Irish film and television director
 Imogen Poots (born 1989), British actress
 Imogen Stuart (born 1927), German sculptor
 Imogen Stubbs (born 1961), English actress
 Imogen Thomas (born 1982), Welsh model and contestant on Big Brother UK
 Imogen Waterhouse (born 1994), English actress and model

Fictional characters
 Imogen (Shakespeare) from William Shakespeare's play Cymbeline
 Imogene, from Vincenzo Bellini's 1827 opera Il pirata
 Imogen, a character from Psyopus' 3-part song "Imogen's Puzzle"
 Imogen, portrayed by Julia Stiles in the comedy Down to You
 Imogen, from the book Bad Dreams by Anne Fine
 Imogen, from the book Imogen by Jilly Cooper
 Imogen, Angus' younger sister in the Australian children's novel Bumface written by Morris Gleitzman
 Imogene Herdman, from Barbara Robinson's children's story The Best Christmas Pageant Ever
 Imogen, daughter of Winifred Dartie (née Forsyte), from The Forsyte Saga
 Imogene, from Charles De Lint's The Blue Girl and In This Soul of a Woman
 Imogene "Idgie" Threadgoode, from Fried Green Tomatoes at the Whistle Stop Cafe
 Imogen, from Jonathan Coe's novel The Rain Before It Falls
 Imogen, from BBC's British children's television comedy-drama series Sadie J
 Imogen Book, from Eoin Colfer's Artemis Fowl: The Time Paradox
 Imogene O'Neil, heroine of the 2009 miniseries Meteor, played by Marla Sokoloff
 Imogen Melford, one of the four Melford sisters in Diana Wynne Jones's The Time of the Ghost
 Imogen Moreno, in the Canadian drama Degrassi
 Imogen Hazard, one of many twin girls in Angela Carter's 1991 book Wise Children
 Imogen, played by Louisa Lytton in the 2009 teen comedy American Pie Presents: The Book of Love
 Imogène, from Charles Exbrayat's series of humorous novels
 Aunt Imogene, from the 2010 film Alice in Wonderland  portrayed by Frances de la Tour
 Imogene, Trixie Delight's maid in Addie Pray by Joe David Brown, also appearing in the film Paper Moon based on the novel
 Imogene Graham, a major character in  Indian Summer, an 1886 novel by William Dean Howells
 Imogen, the principal female character in the Ascendance Trilogy by Jennifer A. Nielsen
 Imogen, from Shades of Grey by Jasper Fforde
 Imogen Clark, a minor character in What Katy Did by Susan Coolidge
 Imogen Reed, from the video game SOMA
 Imogen, from Imogen Says Nothing, a play by Aditi Kapil
 Imogene Cleary, from The Marvelous Mrs. Maisel, an Amazon original TV series. Played by Bailey De Young
 Imogen Staxton-Billing, from the Revengers' Comedies plays and Malcolm Mowbray's 1998 film Sweet Revenge, played by Kristin Scott Thomas
 Imogene Duncan, from the 2012 film Girl Most Likely, played by Kristen Wiig
 Imogen Spurnrose, from the Amazon original series Carnival Row, played by Tamzin Merchant
 Imogen Royce, an assassination target in the Hitman 3 video game
 Imogen Temult, Laura Bailey's character from campaign three of Critical Role
 Imogen Heaney, Rhea Norwood’s character in the Netflix adaptation of Alice Oseman’s series Heartstopper
 Imogen Adams, the protagonist of Pretty Little Liars: Original Sin, played by Bailee Madison
 Imogen Gunn, from Girl Meets Boy by Ali Smith

References  

English feminine given names
Feminine given names